Cartigliano is a small town and comune in the  province of Vicenza, Veneto, north-eastern Italy.  It is located northeast of Vicenza, near the river Brenta.

Twin towns
 Kimle, Hungary

References

External links
Cartiglianonews.it
Zoo park of Cartigliano
Official website
St George old church

Municipalities of the Province of Vicenza